The following lists events that happened during 1998 in Libya.

Incumbents
President: Muammar al-Gaddafi
Prime Minister: Muhammad Ahmad al-Mangoush

Events

August
 August 31 - Libyan planes fly to DRC. The government of Libya says it is to evacuate Arab families who went to the Republic of the Congo from DRC.

September
 September 18 - Kabila flies to Libya, concerning the UN. The United Nations condemns Libya, Sudan and the DRC for breaches against the UN's air embargo against Libya.
 September 19 - President of the Democratic Republic of the Congo Laurent Kabila leaves Tripoli after a visit that violated the UN's embargo on air links with Libya. Again, the United Nations condemns the two countries for this.
 September 20 - Kabila flies to Libya again, as the third time he has violated the UN's air embargo with Libya.

November
 November 30 - Kabila ends talks with Libyan President Muammar Gaddafi about the Congo conflict and a reported agreement on a ceasefire at the Franco-African summit meeting in Paris.

References

 
Years of the 20th century in Libya
Libya
Libya
1990s in Libya